Kari Rose Johnson (born June 11, 1992) better known by her stage name Kari Faux, is an American rapper, singer-songwriter and record producer from Little Rock, Arkansas. She is best known for her flamboyant dress, and conversational style of rap. Her songs are most commonly characterized as "internet rap" with repetitive hooks, minimal production, and an emphasis on clever wordplay.

Early life and education
Faux was born June 11, 1992 to a single teenage mother. She was adopted by a couple that had a 10-year-old son, and raised in Little Rock, Arkansas. Her father worked for the Skippy Peanut Butter factory in Little Rock, and her mother was a minister.

She attended Little Rock Central High School. After graduating she moved to Atlanta, Georgia and enrolled in the Art Institute of Atlanta, to study audio engineering, but dropped out after a while, declaring:
"It sucked. The school is a scam, and I only had one real friend. That was just a bad time. I was so sad. I was smoking a lot of weed, trying to find myself, it was not working, so I took my ass back home.”

Career
In 2014, Faux released her debut mixtape, Laugh Now, Die Later, which had been received somewhat well from critics, landing a spot on Pitchfork's "Most Overlooked Mixtapes of 2014. The EP would most notably gain the attention of rapper Donald Glover, also known as Childish Gambino. Glover remixed Faux's "No Small Talk," and featured it on his own mixtape, STN MTN. Kari was also featured on Glover's 2016 album, "Awaken, My Love!" She released the EP Cry 4 Help in 2019 and the mixtape Lowkey Superstar in 2020. Lowkey Superstar was recorded in London, United Kingdom, with producer Danio.

Personal life
In the fall of 2014 Faux moved to Los Angeles, California with friend and collaborator Malik Flint, in order to further develop her career and produce more music, but went back to Little Rock in 2016. As of 2020, Faux resides again in Los Angeles.

Discography

Studio albums 
Lost En Los Angeles (2016)
Lowkey Superstar (Deluxe) (2021, Don Giovanni/Lowkey Superstar)

EPs
Primary (2017)
Cry 4 Help (2019)

Mixtapes 
City Limits (2012) 
Sophisticated Rachetness (2012)
No Sleep Til Atlanta (2013)
Laugh Now, Die Later (2014)
Lowkey Superstar (2020)

Guest appearances

References 

1992 births
Living people
Rappers from Arkansas
Singers from Arkansas
21st-century African-American women singers
American women rappers
American women singers
21st-century American women musicians
African-American songwriters
21st-century American rappers
Record producers from Arkansas
African-American women rappers
Don Giovanni Records artists
21st-century women rappers